The 19th AARP Movies for Grownups Awards, presented by AARP the Magazine, honored films and television shows released in 2019 and were announced on January 12, 2020. The awards recognized films created by and about people over the age of 50. The ceremony on January 19, 2020 was hosted by actor Tony Danza, and was broadcast on PBS as part of its Great Performances series.

Awards

Winners and Nominees

Winners are listed first, highlighted in boldface, and indicated with a double dagger.

Career Achievement Award
 Annette Bening, for being "fearlessly artistic" in making "films that have a resonant impact on our culture."

Films with multiple nominations and awards

References 

AARP Movies for Grownups Awards
AARP
AARP